James Amilkar Sánchez Altamiranda (born 4 May 1988) is a Colombian professional footballer who plays as a central midfielder for Independiente Medellín.

Honours

Club
Junior
Categoría Primera A (2): 2018–II, 2019–I
Copa Colombia (1): 2017
Superliga Colombiana (2): 2019, 2020

References

1988 births
Living people
Colombian footballers
Association football midfielders
Categoría Primera A players
Atlético Junior footballers
Uniautónoma F.C. footballers
Valledupar F.C. footballers
Footballers from Barranquilla
21st-century Colombian people